The 2010–11 Chicago Bulls season was the 45th season of the franchise in the National Basketball Association (NBA). Led by 22-year old guard Derrick Rose, the Bulls finished the season with a 62–20 record, finishing first-place in the Central Division and advancing to the Eastern Conference Finals where they were eliminated by the Miami Heat superteam led by LeBron James, Dwyane Wade, and Chris Bosh in 5 games. Derrick Rose won the NBA Most Valuable Player Award, becoming the youngest NBA player ever to win the award, at the age of 22.

The Bulls won their 8th division title this season and finished with the best record in the NBA, but fell short to the Miami Heat in the Eastern Conference Finals. It is the first time since 1975 that the Bulls failed to follow up a division title with an NBA title (that year, the Bulls were in the Midwest Division).

In the playoffs, the Bulls defeated the Indiana Pacers in five games in the First Round, defeated the Atlanta Hawks in six games in the semifinals, before losing to the Miami Heat in five games in the Conference Finals. The Heat would eventually lose 4–2 to the Dallas Mavericks in the NBA Finals to win their first championship title.

As of 2021, this is the deepest playoff run that the Bulls have ever had in the post-Michael Jordan era, and it's the only season since 1998 where they made the Conference Finals.

Key dates
 June 24 – The 2010 NBA draft took place in New York City.
 July 1 – The free agency period began.

Summary

NBA Draft

Free agency

Roster

Pre-season

Game log

|- bgcolor="#ffcccc"
| 1
| October 5
| @ Milwaukee
| 
| Kyle Korver (22)
| Joakim Noah (6)
| C. J. Watson (6)
| Bradley Center10,964
| 0–1
|- bgcolor="#ffcccc"
| 2
| October 7
| @ Dallas
| 
| Derrick Rose (17)
| Joakim Noah (8)
| Joakim Noah (6)
| American Airlines Center17,448
| 0–2
|- bgcolor="#ccffcc"
| 3
| October 8
| Washington
| 
| Derrick Rose (18)
| Joakim Noah (11)
| Derrick Rose,Kyle Weaver,James Johnson (5)
| United Center20,898
| 1–2
|- bgcolor="#ccffcc"
| 4
| October 12
| Toronto
| 
| Derrick Rose (23)
| Joakim Noah (14)
| Joakim Noah (8)
| United Center20,165
| 2–2
|- bgcolor="#ffcccc"
| 5
| October 15
| Dallas
| 
| Derrick Rose,Luol Deng (23)
| Joakim Noah (15)
| Joakim Noah (5)
| United Center21,125
| 2–3
|- bgcolor="#ffcccc"
| 6
| October 16
| @ Orlando
| 
| C. J. Watson (13)
| Brian Scalabrine,James Johnson (5)
| C. J. Watson (4)
| Amway Center18,846
| 2–4
|- bgcolor="ccffcc"
| 7
| October 20
| @ Toronto
| 
| Luol Deng (22)
| Ömer Aşık (9)
| Derrick Rose (9)
| Air Canada Centre12,681
| 3–4
|- bgcolor="#ccffcc"
| 8
| October 22
| Indiana
| 
| Luol Deng (29)
| Ömer Aşık (10)
| Derrick Rose (6)
| United Center21,126
| 4–4
|-

Regular season

Standings

Record vs. opponents

Game log

|- bgcolor="#ffcccc"
| 1
| October 27
| @ Oklahoma City
| 
| Derrick Rose (28)
| Joakim Noah (19)
| Derrick Rose (6)
| Oklahoma City Arena18,203
| 0–1
|- bgcolor="#ccffcc"
| 2
| October 30    
| Detroit
| 
| Derrick Rose (39)
| Joakim Noah (17)
| Derrick Rose (7)
| United Center21,038
| 1–1
|-

|- bgcolor="#ccffcc"
| 3
| November 1
| Portland
| 
| Luol Deng (40)
| Joakim Noah (10)
| Derrick Rose (13)
| United Center21,057
| 2–1
|- bgcolor="#ffcccc"
| 4
| November 4
| New York
| 
| Derrick Rose (24)
| Joakim Noah (13)
| Derrick Rose (14)
| United Center21,203
| 2–2
|- bgcolor="#ffcccc"
| 5
| November 5
| @ Boston
| 
| Joakim Noah (26)
| Joakim Noah (12)
| Derrick Rose (9)
| TD Garden18,624
| 2–3
|- bgcolor="#ccffcc"
| 6
| November 8
| Denver
| 
| Derrick Rose (18)
| Joakim Noah (19)
| Derrick Rose (6)
| United Center21,355
| 3–3
|- bgcolor="#ccffcc"
| 7
| November 11
| Golden State
| 
| Luol Deng (26)
| Luol Deng (11)
| Derrick Rose (13)
| United Center21,140
| 4–3
|- bgcolor="#ccffcc"
| 8
| November 13
| Washington
| 
| Derrick Rose (24)
| Luol Deng (9)
| Derrick Rose (8)
| United Center21,610
| 5–3
|- bgcolor="#ccffcc"
| 9
| November 16
| @ Houston
| 
| Derrick Rose (33)
| Luol Deng (10)
| Derrick Rose (7)
| Toyota Center18,158
| 6–3
|- bgcolor="#ffcccc"
| 10
| November 17
| @ San Antonio
| 
| Derrick Rose (33)
| Joakim Noah (14)
| Derrick Rose (4)
| AT&T Center18,581
| 6–4
|- bgcolor="#ccffcc"
| 11
| November 19
| @ Dallas
| 
| Derrick Rose (22)
| Taj Gibson (18)
| Derrick Rose (6)
| American Airlines Center20,133
| 7–4
|- bgcolor="#ffcccc"
| 12
| November 23
| @ L.A. Lakers
| 
| Derrick Rose (30)
| Joakim Noah (13)
| Derrick Rose (8)
| Staples Center18,997
| 7–5
|- bgcolor="#ccffcc"
| 13
| November 24
| @ Phoenix
| 
| Derrick Rose (35)
| Joakim Noah (15)
| Derrick Rose (7)
| US Airways Center18,422
| 8–5
|- bgcolor="#ffcccc"
| 14
| November 26
| @ Denver
| 
| C. J. Watson (33)
| Joakim Noah (16)
| Joakim Noah (4)
| Pepsi Center19,155
| 8–6
|- bgcolor="#ccffcc"
| 15
| November 27
| @ Sacramento
| 
| Derrick Rose (30)
| Ronnie Brewer (10)
| Derrick Rose (7)
| ARCO Arena13,504
| 9–6
|-

|- bgcolor="#ffcccc"
| 16
| December 1
| Orlando
| 
| Joakim Noah (16)
| Luol Deng,Taj Gibson (4)
| Joakim Noah,Derrick Rose (4)
| United Center21,435
| 9–7
|- bgcolor="#ffcccc"
| 17
| December 3
| @ Boston
| 
| Derrick Rose (20)
| Joakim Noah (10)
| Derrick Rose (8)
| TD Garden18,624
| 9–8
|- bgcolor="#ccffcc"
| 18
| December 4
| Houston
| 
| Derrick Rose (30)
| Joakim Noah (12)
| Derrick Rose (11)
| United Center21,232
| 10–8
|- bgcolor="#ccffcc"
| 19
| December 6
| Oklahoma City
| 
| Carlos Boozer (29)
| Carlos Boozer,Joakim Noah (12)
| Derrick Rose (9)
| United Center21,184
| 11–8
|- bgcolor="#ccffcc"
| 20
| December 8
| @ Cleveland
| 
| Derrick Rose (29)
| Joakim Noah (14)
| Derrick Rose (8)
| Quicken Loans Arena20,562
| 12–8
|- bgcolor="#ccffcc"
| 21
| December 10
| L.A. Lakers
| 
| Derrick Rose (29)
| Carlos Boozer (11)
| Derrick Rose (9)
| United Center22,760
| 13–8
|- bgcolor="#ccffcc"
| 22
| December 11
| Minnesota
| 
| Derrick Rose (21)
| Taj Gibson,Joakim Noah (10)
| Derrick Rose (7)
| United Center21,102
| 14–8
|- bgcolor="#ccffcc"
| 23
| December 13
| Indiana
| 
| Carlos Boozer (22)
| Carlos Boozer (18)
| Derrick Rose (12)
| United Center21,287
| 15–8
|- bgcolor="#ccffcc"
| 24
| December 15
| @ Toronto
| 
| Carlos Boozer (34)
| Carlos Boozer (12)
| Derrick Rose (11)
| Air Canada Centre17,750
| 16–8
|- bgcolor="#ffcccc"
| 25
| December 18
| L.A. Clippers
| 
| Derrick Rose (34)
| Luol Deng (8)
| Derrick Rose (8)
| United Center21,760
| 16–9
|- bgcolor="#ccffcc"
| 26
| December 21
| Philadelphia
| 
| Luol Deng,Derrick Rose (22)
| Carlos Boozer (11)
| Derrick Rose (12)
| United Center21,521
| 17–9
|- bgcolor="#ccffcc"
| 27
| December 22
| @ Washington
| 
| Carlos Boozer (30)
| Carlos Boozer (10)
| Carlos Boozer (7)
| Verizon Center18,011
| 18–9
|- bgcolor="#ffcccc"
| 28
| December 25
| @ New York
| 
| Carlos Boozer (26)
| Carlos Boozer (19)
| Derrick Rose (8)
| Madison Square Garden19,763
| 18–10
|- bgcolor="#ccffcc"
| 29
| December 26
| @ Detroit
| 
| Carlos Boozer (31)
| Derrick Rose (12)
| Derrick Rose (8)
| The Palace of Auburn Hills20,765
| 19–10
|-bgcolor="#ccffcc"
| 30
| December 28
| Milwaukee
| 
| Carlos Boozer,Luol Deng (24)
| Carlos Boozer (9)
| Derrick Rose (12)
| United Center22,091
| 20–10
|- bgcolor="#ccffcc"
| 31
| December 31
| New Jersey
| 
| Carlos Boozer (20)
| Carlos Boozer (15)
| Derrick Rose (9)
| United Center21,792
| 21–10
|-

|- bgcolor="#ccffcc"
| 32
| January 1
| Cleveland
| 
| Derrick Rose (28)
| Kurt Thomas (13)
| Derrick Rose (11)
| United Center21,416
| 22–10
|- bgcolor="#ccffcc"
| 33
| January 4
| Toronto
| 
| Luol Deng (24)
| Taj Gibson (14)
| Derrick Rose (6)
| United Center21,290
| 23–10
|- bgcolor="#ffcccc"
| 34
| January 5
| @ New Jersey
| 
| Derrick Rose (21)
| Carlos Boozer (9)
| Carlos Boozer (5)
| Prudential Center15,025
| 23–11
|- bgcolor="#ffcccc"
| 35
| January 7
| @ Philadelphia
| 
| Carlos Boozer (31)
| Carlos Boozer (13)
| Derrick Rose (9)
| Wells Fargo Center15,303
| 23–12
|- bgcolor="#ccffcc"
| 36
| January 8
| Boston
| 
| Derrick Rose (36)
| Carlos Boozer (10)
| Luol Deng (5)
| United Center22,663
| 24–12
|- bgcolor="#ccffcc"
| 37
| January 10
| Detroit
| 
| Derrick Rose (29)
| Carlos Boozer (11)
| Derrick Rose (7)
| United Center21,407
| 25–12
|- bgcolor="#ffcccc"
| 38
| January 12
| @ Charlotte
| 
| Carlos Boozer (23)
| Carlos Boozer (14)
| Derrick Rose (7)
| Time Warner Cable Arena12,468
| 25–13
|- bgcolor="#ccffcc"
| 39
| January 14
| @ Indiana
| 
| Derrick Rose (29)
| Kurt Thomas (18)
| Ronnie Brewer,Luol Deng,Derrick Rose (5)
| Conseco Fieldhouse18,165
| 26–13
|- bgcolor="#ccffcc"
| 40
| January 15
| Miami
| 
| Derrick Rose (34)
| Carlos Boozer (10)
| Derrick Rose (8)
| United Center23,017
| 27–13
|- bgcolor="#ccffcc"
| 41
| January 17
| @ Memphis
| 
| Luol Deng (28)
| Derrick Rose (10)
| Derrick Rose (12)
| FedExForum18,119
| 28–13
|- bgcolor="#ffcccc"
| 42
| January 18
| Charlotte
| 
| Derrick Rose (33)
| Kurt Thomas (10)
| Luol Deng,Derrick Rose (4)
| United Center21,263
| 28–14
|- bgcolor="#ccffcc"
| 43
| January 20
| Dallas
| 
| Derrick Rose (26)
| Luol Deng (12)
| Derrick Rose (9)
| United Center21,397
| 29–14
|- bgcolor="#ccffcc"
| 44
| January 22
| Cleveland
| 
| Derrick Rose (24)
| Luol Deng (12)
| Derrick Rose (8)
| United Center21,389
| 30–14
|- bgcolor="#ccffcc"
| 45
| January 24
| Milwaukee
| 
| Kurt Thomas (22)
| Carlos Boozer,Kurt Thomas (9)
| Derrick Rose (10)
| United Center21,126
| 31–14
|- bgcolor="#ccffcc"
| 46
| January 28
| Orlando
| 
| Luol Deng (26)
| Carlos Boozer (16)
| Derrick Rose (12)
| United Center21,676
| 32–14
|- bgcolor="#ccffcc"
| 47
| January 29
| Indiana
| 
| Carlos Boozer (24)
| Carlos Boozer (10)
| Luol Deng (8)
| United Center21,611
| 33–14
|-

|- bgcolor="#ccffcc"
| 48
| February 2
| @ L.A. Clippers
| 
| Derrick Rose (32)
| Taj Gibson (12)
| Derrick Rose (11)
| Staples Center19,368
| 34–14
|- bgcolor="#ffcccc"
| 49
| February 5
| @ Golden State
| 
| Carlos Boozer (21)
| Carlos Boozer (10)
| Derrick Rose (10)
| Oracle Arena19,596
| 34–15
|- bgcolor="#ffcccc"
| 50
| February 7
| @ Portland
| 
| Derrick Rose (36)
| Carlos Boozer (12)
| Derrick Rose (6)
| Rose Garden20,534
| 34–16
|- bgcolor="#ccffcc"
| 51
| February 9
| @ Utah
| 
| Derrick Rose (29)
| Ömer Aşık,Luol Deng (7)
| Derrick Rose (7)
| EnergySolutions Arena19,911
| 35–16
|- bgcolor="#ccffcc"
| 52
| February 12
| @ New Orleans
| 
| Derrick Rose (23)
| Ömer Aşık,Kurt Thomas (11)
| Derrick Rose (6)
| New Orleans Arena17,831
| 36–16
|- bgcolor="#ccffcc"
| 53
| February 15
| Charlotte
| 
| Luol Deng (24)
| Carlos Boozer (9)
| Derrick Rose (13)
| United Center21,391
| 37–16
|- bgcolor="#ccffcc"
| 54
| February 17
| San Antonio
| 
| Derrick Rose (42)
| Kurt Thomas (9)
| Derrick Rose (8)
| United Center22,172
| 38–16
|- align="center"
|colspan="9" bgcolor="#bbcaff"|All-Star Break
|- bgcolor="#ffcccc"
| 55
| February 23
| @ Toronto
| 
| Derrick Rose (32)
| Joakim Noah (16)
| Derrick Rose (10)
| Air Canada Centre18,105
| 38–17
|- bgcolor="#ccffcc"
| 56
| February 24
| Miami
| 
| Derrick Rose (26)
| Ömer Aşık (11)
| Derrick Rose (6)
| United Center23,024
| 39–17
|- bgcolor="#ccffcc"
| 57
| February 26
| @ Milwaukee
| 
| Luol Deng (19)
| Joakim Noah (17)
| Derrick Rose (4)
| Bradley Center18,717
| 40–17
|- bgcolor="#ccffcc"
| 58
| February 28
| @ Washington
| 
| Luol Deng,Derrick Rose (21)
| Joakim Noah (11)
| Derrick Rose (9)
| Verizon Center17,873
| 41–17
|-

|- bgcolor="#ffcccc"
| 59
| March 2
| @ Atlanta
| 
| Luol Deng (15)
| Joakim Noah (12)
| Derrick Rose (12)
| Philips Arena16,928
| 41–18
|- bgcolor="#ccffcc"
| 60
| March 4
| @ Orlando
| 
| Derrick Rose (24)
| Ömer Aşık (13)
| Ronnie Brewer,Derrick Rose (4)
| Amway Center19,207
| 42–18
|- bgcolor="#ccffcc"
| 61
| March 6
| @ Miami
| 
| Derrick Rose (27)
| Carlos Boozer (10)
| Derrick Rose (5)
| American Airlines Arena19,763
| 43–18
|- bgcolor="#ccffcc"
| 62
| March 7
| New Orleans
| 
| Derrick Rose (24)
| Joakim Noah (13)
| Derrick Rose (9)
| United Center21,997
| 44–18
|- bgcolor="#ccffcc"
| 63
| March 9
| @ Charlotte
| 
| Kyle Korver,Derrick Rose (20)
| Joakim Noah (13)
| Derrick Rose,C. J. Watson (6)
| Time Warner Cable Arena15,286
| 45–18
|- bgcolor="#ccffcc"
| 64
| March 11
| Atlanta
| 
| Derrick Rose (34)
| Kurt Thomas (13)
| Luol Deng (7)
| United Center22,123
| 46–18
|- bgcolor="#ccffcc"
| 65
| March 12
| Utah
| 
| Luol Deng,Derrick Rose (26)
| Joakim Noah,Kurt Thomas (9)
| C. J. Watson (8)
| United Center22,885
| 47–18
|- bgcolor="#ccffcc"
| 66
| March 15
| Washington
| 
| Derrick Rose (23)
| Kurt Thomas (15)
| Derrick Rose (7)
| United Center22,103
| 48–18
|- bgcolor="#ccffcc"
| 67
| March 17
| @ New Jersey
| 
| Derrick Rose (21)
| Ömer Aşık (16)
| Joakim Noah (6)
| Prudential Center18,351
| 49–18
|- bgcolor="#ffcccc"
| 68
| March 18
| @ Indiana
| 
| Derrick Rose (42)
| Taj Gibson (16)
| Keith Bogans (3)
| Conseco Fieldhouse18,165
| 49–19
|- bgcolor="#ccffcc"
| 69
| March 21
| Sacramento
| 
| Kyle Korver,Derrick Rose (18)
| Joakim Noah (9)
| Derrick Rose (8)
| United Center21,873
| 50–19
|- bgcolor="#ccffcc"
| 70
| March 22
| @ Atlanta
| 
| Derrick Rose (30)
| Taj Gibson (8)
| Derrick Rose (10)
| Philips Arena18,203
| 51–19
|- bgcolor="#ccffcc"
| 71
| March 25
| Memphis
| 
| Derrick Rose (24)
| Carlos Boozer (9)
| Derrick Rose (7)
| United Center22,274
| 52–19
|- bgcolor="#ccffcc"
| 72
| March 26
| @ Milwaukee
| 
| Derrick Rose (30)
| Carlos Boozer,Joakim Noah (11)
| Derrick Rose (17)
| Bradley Center18,717
| 53–19
|- bgcolor="#ffcccc"
| 73
| March 28
| Philadelphia
| 
| Derrick Rose (31)
| Joakim Noah (13)
| Derrick Rose (5)
| United Center22,210
| 53–20
|- bgcolor="#ccffcc"
| 74
| March 30
| @ Minnesota
| 
| Carlos Boozer (24)
| Carlos Boozer (14)
| Derrick Rose (10)
| Target Center19,207
| 54–20
|-

|- bgcolor="#ccffcc"
| 75
| April 1
| @ Detroit
| 
| Derrick Rose (27)
| Carlos Boozer,Kurt Thomas (8)
| Carlos Boozer,Derrick Rose (7)
| The Palace of Auburn Hills22,076
| 55–20
|- bgcolor="#ccffcc"
| 76
| April 2
| Toronto
| 
| Derrick Rose (36)
| Carlos Boozer (10)
| Derrick Rose (10)
| United Center22,228
| 56–20
|- bgcolor="#ccffcc"
| 77
| April 5
| Phoenix
| 
| Derrick Rose (19)
| Carlos Boozer,Taj Gibson (9)
| Carlos Boozer (7)
| United Center21,873
| 57–20
|- bgcolor="#ccffcc"
| 78
| April 7
| Boston
| 
| Derrick Rose (30)
| Carlos Boozer (12)
| Derrick Rose (8)
| United Center23,067
| 58–20
|- bgcolor="#ccffcc"
| 79
| April 8
| @ Cleveland
| 
| Carlos Boozer (24)
| Carlos Boozer (11)
| Derrick Rose (8)
| Quicken Loans Arena20,562
| 59–20
|- bgcolor="#ccffcc"
| 80
| April 10
| @ Orlando
| 
| Derrick Rose (39)
| Taj Gibson (11)
| Carlos Boozer (6)
| Amway Center19,181
| 60–20
|- bgcolor="#ccffcc"
| 81
| April 12
| @ New York
| 
| Derrick Rose (26)
| Carlos Boozer (22)
| Carlos Boozer,Luol Deng (4)
| Madison Square Garden19,763
| 61–20
|- bgcolor="#ccffcc"
| 82
| April 13
| New Jersey
| 
| Kyle Korver (19)
| Joakim Noah (10)
| C. J. Watson (6)
| United Center22,420
| 62–20

Playoffs

Game log

|- bgcolor=ccffcc
| 1
| April 16
| Indiana
| 
| Derrick Rose (39)
| Joakim Noah (11)
| Derrick Rose (6)
| United Center22,986
| 1–0
|- bgcolor=ccffcc
| 2
| April 18
| Indiana
| 
| Derrick Rose (36)
| Carlos Boozer (16)
| Derrick Rose (6)
| United Center22,480
| 2–0
|- bgcolor=ccffcc
| 3
| April 21
| @ Indiana
| 
| Derrick Rose (23)
| Carlos Boozer (11)
| Luol Deng (6)
| Conseco Fieldhouse18,165
| 3–0
|- bgcolor=ffcccc
| 4
| April 23
| @ Indiana
| 
| Joakim Noah (21)
| Joakim Noah (14)
| Derrick Rose (10)
| Conseco Fieldhouse18,165
| 3–1
|- bgcolor=ccffcc
| 5
| April 26
| Indiana
| 
| Derrick Rose (25)
| Joakim Noah (8)
| Luol Deng,C. J. Watson (7)
| United Center22,822
| 4–1

|- bgcolor=ffcccc
| 1
| May 2
| Atlanta
| 
| Derrick Rose (24)
| Joakim Noah (9)
| Derrick Rose (10)
| United Center22,890
| 0–1
|- bgcolor=ccffcc
| 2
| May 4
| Atlanta
| 
| Derrick Rose (25)
| Joakim Noah (14)
| Derrick Rose (10)
| United Center22,872
| 1–1
|- bgcolor=ccffcc
| 3
| May 6
| @ Atlanta
| 
| Derrick Rose (44)
| Joakim Noah (15)
| Derrick Rose (7)
| Philips Arena19,521
| 2–1
|- bgcolor=ffcccc
| 4
| May 8
| @ Atlanta
| 
| Derrick Rose (34)
| Joakim Noah (11)
| Derrick Rose (10)
| Philips Arena19,263
| 2–2
|- bgcolor=ccffcc
| 5
| May 10
| Atlanta
| 
| Derrick Rose (33)
| Carlos Boozer (12)
| Derrick Rose (9)
| United Center22,980
| 3–2
|- bgcolor=ccffcc
| 6
| May 12
| @ Atlanta
| 
| Carlos Boozer (23)
| Carlos Boozer (10)
| Derrick Rose (12)
| Philips Arena19,378
| 4–2

|- bgcolor=ccffcc
| 1
| May 15
| Miami
| 
| Derrick Rose (28)
| Joakim Noah (14)
| Derrick Rose (6)
| United Center22,874
| 1–0
|- bgcolor=ffcccc
| 2
| May 18
| Miami
| 
| Derrick Rose (21)
| Carlos Boozer,Joakim Noah (8)
| Derrick Rose (8)
| United Center23,007
| 1–1
|- bgcolor=ffcccc
| 3
| May 22
| @ Miami
| 
| Carlos Boozer (26)
| Carlos Boozer (17)
| Joakim Noah (6)
| American Airlines Arena20,123
| 1–2
|- bgcolor=ffcccc
| 4
| May 24
| @ Miami
| 
| Derrick Rose (23)
| Joakim Noah (14)
| Joakim Noah,Derrick Rose (6)
| American Airlines Arena20,125
| 1–3
|- bgcolor=ffcccc
| 5
| May 26
| Miami
| 
| Derrick Rose (25)
| Joakim Noah,Kurt Thomas (8)
| Derrick Rose (8)
| United Center23,057
| 1–4

Player statistics

Season

|-
|- align="center" bgcolor=""
| Ömer Aşık || style="background:black;color:#d40026;" | 82 || 0 || 12.1 || style="background:black;color:#d40026;" | .553 || .0 || .500 || 3.7 || 0.4 || .24 || .68 || 2.8
|- align="center" bgcolor="#f0f0f0"
| Keith Bogans || style="background:black;color:#d40026;" | 82 || style="background:black;color:#d40026;" | 82 || 17.8 || .404 || .380 || .660 || 1.8 || 1.2 || .46 || .11 || 4.4
|- align="center" bgcolor=""
| Carlos Boozer || 59 || 59 || 31.9 || .510 || .0 || .700 || 9.6 || 2.5 || .76 || .31 || 17.5
|- align="center" bgcolor="#f0f0f0"
| Ronnie Brewer || 81 || 1 || 22.2 || .480 || .222 || .650 || 3.2 || 1.7 || style="background:black;color:#d40026;" | 1.31 || .27 || 6.2
|- align="center" bgcolor="#f0f0f0"
| Rasual Butler || 6 || 0 || 4.3 || .545 || .571 || .0 || .2 || .0 || .0 || .20 || 2.7
|- align="center" bgcolor="#f0f0f0"
| Luol Deng || style="background:black;color:#d40026;" | 82 || style="background:black;color:#d40026;" | 82 || style="background:black;color:#d40026;" | 39.1 || .460 || .345 || .750 || 5.8 || 2.8 || .95 || .5.9 || 17.4
|- align="center" bgcolor="#f0f0f0"
| Taj Gibson || 80 || 19 || 21.8 || .466 || .125 || .680 || 5.7 || 0.7 || .49  || 1.33 || 7.1
|- align="center" bgcolor=""
| Kyle Korver || style="background:black;color:#d40026;" | 82 || 0 || 20.1 || .435 || .415 || style="background:black;color:#d40026;" | .89 || 1.8 || 1.5 || .43 || .24 || 8.3
|- align="center" bgcolor="f0f0f0"
| Joakim Noah || 48 || 48 || 32.8 || .525 || .0 || .740 || style="background:black;color:#d40026;" | 10.4 || 2.2 || 1.00 || style="background:black;color:#d40026;" | 1.50 || 11.7
|- align="center" bgcolor=""
| Derrick Rose || 81 || 81 || 37.4 || .445 || .332 || .860 || 4.1 || style="background:black;color:#d40026;" | 7.7 || 1.05 || .63 || style="background:black;color:#d40026;" | 25.0
|- align="center" bgcolor=""
| Kurt Thomas || 52 || 37 || 22.7 || .511 || style="background:black;color:#d40026;" | 1.00 || .630 || 5.8 || 1.2 || .62 || .81 || 4.1
|- align="center" bgcolor="#f0f0f0"
| C. J. Watson || style="background:black;color:#d40026;" | 82 || 1 || 13.3 || .371 || .393 || .740 || 1.1 || 2.3 || .67 || .13 || 4.9
|}

Playoffs
 The Bulls regular season record of 62–20 was the best in the NBA and assured the Bulls of home court advantage throughout the playoffs.

|-
|- align="center" bgcolor=""
| Ömer Aşık || style="background:black;color:#d40026;" | 15 || 0 || 9.9 || .462 || .0 || .300 || 2.1 || .1 || .13 || .53 || 1.0
|- align="center" bgcolor="#f0f0f0"
| Keith Bogans || style="background:black;color:#d40026;" | 16 || style="background:black;color:#d40026;" | 16 || 19.2 || .406 || .424 || .250 || 1.3 || .8 || .63 || .19 || 5.1
|- align="center" bgcolor=""
| Carlos Boozer || style="background:black;color:#d40026;" | 16 || style="background:black;color:#d40026;" | 16 || 31.7 || .433 || .0 || .800 || 9.7 || 1.8 || .56 || .44 || 12.6
|- align="center" bgcolor="#f0f0f0"
| Ronnie Brewer || style="background:black;color:#d40026;" | 16 || 0 || 16.3 || .480 || .429 || .765 || 2.1 || .9 || .75 || .38 || 4.0
|- align="center" bgcolor="#f0f0f0"
| Rasual Butler || 3 || 0 || 2.3 || style="background:black;color:#d40026;" | 1.000 ||  style="background:black;color:#d40026;" | 1.000 || .0 || .3 || .0 || .0 || .0 || 1.0
|- align="center" bgcolor="#f0f0f0"
| Luol Deng || style="background:black;color:#d40026;" | 16 || style="background:black;color:#d40026;" | 16 || style="background:black;color:#d40026;" | 42.9 || .426 || .324 || .839 || 6.6 || 2.7 || style="background:black;color:#d40026;" | 1.50 || .63 || 16.9
|- align="center" bgcolor="#f0f0f0"
| Taj Gibson || style="background:black;color:#d40026;" | 16 || 0 || 17.8 || .566 || .000 || .600 || 4.1 || 0.6 || .31  || 1.38 || 5.9
|- align="center" bgcolor=""
| Kyle Korver || style="background:black;color:#d40026;" | 16 || 0 || 17.3 || .388 || .423 || style="background:black;color:#d40026;" | 1.000 || 1.2 || 1.1 || .50 || .19 || 6.6
|- align="center" bgcolor="f0f0f0"
| Joakim Noah || style="background:black;color:#d40026;" | 16 ||  style="background:black;color:#d40026;" | 16 || 33.1 || .411 || .0 || .725 || style="background:black;color:#d40026;" | 10.2 || 2.5 || 1.0 || style="background:black;color:#d40026;" | 2.06 || 8.7
|- align="center" bgcolor=""
| Derrick Rose || style="background:black;color:#d40026;" | 16 ||  style="background:black;color:#d40026;" | 16 || 40.6 || .396 || .248 || .828 || 4.3 || style="background:black;color:#d40026;" | 7.7 ||  1.38 || .69 || style="background:black;color:#d40026;" | 27.1
|- align="center" bgcolor="#f0f0f0"
| Kurt Thomas || 7 || 0 || 10.6 || .556 || .000 || .000 || 2.7 || .4 || .14 || .43 || 2.9
|- align="center" bgcolor="#f0f0f0"
| C. J. Watson || style="background:black;color:#d40026;" | 16 || 0 || 8.5 || .339 || .200 || .909 || .9 || 1.9 || .50 || .0 || 3.2
|}

Awards, records and milestones

Awards
 Tom Thibodeau wins NBA Coach of the Year
 Derrick Rose is named NBA Most Valuable Player
 Gar Forman wins the NBA Executive of the Year Award, along with Miami Heat President Pat Riley.
 Derrick Rose made the All-NBA First Team
 Joakim Noah made the NBA All-Defensive Second Team

Week/Month
 On November 15, Derrick Rose was named Eastern Conference Player of the Week (November 8–14).
 Coach Tom Thibodeau was named Coach of the Month for January.
 Coach Tom Thibodeau was named Coach of the Month for March.
 Derrick Rose was named Player of the Month for March.

All-Star
 Derrick Rose was the starting point guard at the 2010–2011 NBA All-Star game. In just under 30 minutes of playing time, Rose scored 11 points with 3 rebounds, 5 assists, and 1 steal.

Season
 Luol Deng, a former winner (2006–2007) of the NBA Sportsmanship Award, finished second behind Stephen Curry of the Golden State Warriors for this year's award.

Records
 On March 12 the Bulls set a franchise record 18 converted 3-point shots in a game against the Utah Jazz. The previous record was 15 set in '94.
 Derrick Rose, at age 21, became the youngest MVP winner by winning this year's MVP title.

Milestones
Kurt Thomas played in his 1000th game in a contest vs the Charlotte Bobcats on Feb 15, 2011 at the United Center.

Derrick Rose scored a career high 44 pts vs the Atlanta Hawks on May 6, 2011.

Derrick Rose also had his first career triple-double at the Memphis Grizzlies on Jan 17, 2011.

The 62 wins by the Bulls is the most since the 97–98 season.

After defeating the New York Knicks on April 12, 2011, the Bulls became the only team of the 2010–2011 season to defeat all 29 other teams at least once.

Chicago Bulls Derrick Rose won 2010-11 NBA MVP and single-handedly led his team to the Best NBA Regular Season Record without any All-Star teammates.  This put him in a very small pct. of players in NBA History that won MVP and led their team to best regular season record without any All-Star teammates.

Injuries and surgeries
 Carlos Boozer underwent surgery on October 5 to repair a fractured right hand. He claimed to have tripped over a bag at his home. After missing the first 15 games of the season, Boozer made his return on December 1 in a loss against the Orlando Magic.
 Joakim Noah underwent surgery on December 16 to repair a torn ligament in his right hand. He suffered the injury in a game against the Sacramento Kings on November 27. He returned to action in the 55th game of the season on February 23 after recuperating from right thumb surgery. He scored 7 points and had 16 rebounds in just over 24 minutes.
 Taj Gibson suffered a concussion in a game against the Los Angeles Clippers on December 18. He missed one game before suiting up for a game against the Washington Wizards on December 22, playing just 31 seconds.
 Carlos Boozer missed the January 17 game against the Memphis Grizzlies with a sprained ankle. He returned to play in the Jan 22 game against Cleveland.
 Carlos Boozer missed the March 11 game against the Atlanta Hawks with a sprained ankle. He missed 4 subsequent games and returned for the March 21 game against the Sacramento Kings
 Joakim Noah returned to the inactive list for games 74, 75 and 76.

Transactions

Trades

Free agents

Additions

Subtractions

References

Chicago Bulls seasons
Chicago
Chicago
Chicago